Susan Ann Dimock is a Canadian philosopher and professor of philosophy at York University. 
She is known for her expertise on meta-ethics and applied ethics. Dimock is the editor-in-chief of Dialogue: Canadian Philosophical Review.

Career
Dimock earned her Bachelor of Arts from the University of New Brunswick before earning her master's degree at York University and PhD from Dalhousie University. From there, she was hired as an assistant professor at York University in 1991. 

In 1998, Dimcock was awarded the President's University-Wide Teaching Awards in Philosophy and Arts. While at the university, Dimock served as Chair of York's Senate, Chair of Faculty Council, Director of the York Centre for Practical Ethics, and as President of York's Faculty Association.

References

External links
Susan Ann Dimock at York University

Living people
Year of birth missing (living people)
21st-century Canadian philosophers
Philosophy academics
Dalhousie University alumni
Academic staff of York University
Philosophy journal editors
Canadian women philosophers
Canadian women academics